The Kirindy Mitea National Park is a national park on the coast of the Mozambique Channel, in south-west Madagascar. The  park contains many endemic animals and plants and claims to have the greatest density of primates in the world.

Geography
The national park is situated on the south-west coast of the Mozambique Channel and includes a marine area with seven small islands. It is situated in the Menabe Region south of Morondava on the territory of the municipalities of  Akiliabo, Beharona and Andranopasy. 
It is surrounded by the Maharivo River and Lampaolo River.

During the warm, dry season from March to November, much of the wildlife is hibernating, the vegetation is brown and the trees are leafless. Animals and plants come to life in the rainy season when temperature can reach 

The dominant ethnic group in the area are the Sakalava people.

Flora and fauna
There are a wide range of ecosystems due to reserve being in an area where southern and western biotypes meet. Within the park is the largest remaining area of dry deciduous forest, tropical dry forest, spiny forest, beaches and sand-dunes, mangroves and coral reefs. One hundred and eighty-five species of plants have, so far, been recorded, among them three species of baobab, as well as seven species of mangrove trees.

In this park are found eleven species of mammals of which ten are endemic. Among them are the Madame Berthe's mouse lemur (Microcebus berthae), the smallest primate in the world, which is only known from this park.  Also the fossa (Cryptoprocta ferox), Madagascar's largest living predator, and the lemurs only predator (apart from people). Other mammals endemic to the Menabe region include the giant jumping rat (Hypogeomys antimena) and the narrow-striped mongoose (Mungotictis decemlineata). There are also forty-seven species of birds (thirty-three endemic) and twenty-three species of reptiles.

Kirindy supports eight species of lemur:

 Madame Berthe’s mouse lemur – Microcebus berthae
 Red-fronted brown lemur – Eulemur rufifrons
 Pale fork-marked lemur – Phaner pallescens
 Grey mouse lemur – Microcebus murinus
 Coquerel's dwarf lemur – Mirza coquereli
 Fat-tailed dwarf lemur – Cheirogaleus medius
 Red-tailed sportive lemur – Lepilemur ruficaudatus
 Verreaux's sifaka – Propithecus verreauxi

Gallery

References

External links

 Official site

1997 establishments in Madagascar
Menabe
National parks of Madagascar
Protected areas established in 1997
Madagascar succulent woodlands
Important Bird Areas of Madagascar